Éric Piolle (born 6 January 1973) is a French politician of Europe Ecology – The Greens (EELV) who has been serving as mayor of Grenoble since 2014.
. He was Regional Councillor of Rhône-Alpes from March 2010 to April 2014.

Education and business career
Piolle was born in Pau, France where he attended Lycée Louis-Barthou. After graduating, he went to the Grenoble Institute of Technology to study engineering.

He joined the Hewlett-Packard Company in 2001, and became a senior manager at the Grenoble site. In February 2011, he was fired for refusing to set up a relocation plan.

He co-founded the company Raise Partners, a company specializing in financial risk management.

Political career

Early beginnings
In 1997, at 24, Piolle was a parliamentary candidate for  the eighth district of  Isère as a Miscellaneous left, he won 1.35% of the votes. In 2002 he was a substitute candidate during the legislative elections for the first district of Isère.

In March 2010, Piolle was elected as a regional councilor of Isère, which is a department in the Rhône-Alpes region, as a member of Europe Ecology.

In June 2012, Piolle was a parliamentary candidate for the first district of Isère as a member of EELV, he won 7.7% of votes.

Mayor of Grenoble
In 2014, Piolle became a candidate for mayor of Grenoble during the municipal elections, his motto being "Grenoble, Une Ville pour Tous" (Grenoble, A City for All). He was the leading candidate throughout the race, gathering support from environmentalists,  EELV, the Left Party, The Alternatives, the Anticapitalist Left, and two local associations, ADES and the Citizen Network. He was elected during a city council session on April 4, 2014, succeeding Michel Destot (PS) as mayor of Grenoble. He received 50 votes out of the 59 councilors. After this election Grenoble becomes the first French city with more than 100 000 inhabitants to elect an EELV municipal government.

After winning the election, Piolle declined to run for president of Grenoble-Alpes Métropole, and resigned from his position as a regional councilor of Rhône-Alpes.

In the French presidential election of 2017, Piolle called on voters to support Jean-Luc Mélenchon.

Following a proposal by Piolle, the municipal council of Grenoble voted in favour of allowing the use of body-covering "burkini" bathing suits for women in municipal pools in May 2022, sparking protest from conservative and far-right politicians. In response, Minister of the Interior Gérald Darmanin filed an objection against the burkini permit. Shortly after, a French administrative court  suspended the city of Grenoble's decision.

References 

Mayors of Grenoble
1973 births
Living people
Europe Ecology – The Greens politicians
Grenoble Institute of Technology alumni
21st-century French engineers
21st-century French scientists